Despoina "Debbie" Vogasari (born 9 July 1995) is a Greek former professional tennis player.

Born in Athens, Vogasari featured as a doubles player in four Fed Cup ties for Greece as a 17-year old in 2013, partnering Despina Papamichail. She had a career high singles ranking of 508 in the world and won three titles on the ITF Women's Circuit.

Educated in the United States, Vogasari played three seasons of collegiate tennis for the University of Houston, before transferring to the University of Kansas for her final year of eligibility. While at Houston in 2015, she was named the women's American Athletic Conference (ACC) Player of the Year.

ITF finals

Singles: 3–3

Doubles: 1–5

References

External links
 
 
 

1995 births
Living people
Greek female tennis players
Houston Cougars women's tennis players
Kansas Jayhawks women's tennis players
People from Athens